Take Off Your Clothes, Doll (German: Zieh dich aus, Puppe) is a 1968 West German comedy drama film directed by Ákos Ráthonyi and starring Anke Syring, Astrid Frank and Christiane Rücker.

Synopsis
A young woman from a wealthy background runs away from her parents' home to live with her boyfriend. However, when he discovers that her father has cut her off financially, he loses any interest to continue their relationship and abandons her. She ends up working in a rough strip club before she is eventually rescued.

Cast
 Anke Syring  as Sylvia 
 Astrid Frank  as Marianne 
 Christiane Rücker  as Liane 
 Gaby Gasser  as Rita 
 Linda Caroll  as Jessica 
 Petra Mood  as Andrea 
 Elisabeth Volkmann  as Diana 
 Christine Schuberth as Christine 
 Annemarie Wendl  as Garderobiere 
 Felix Franchy as Micky 
 Michael Berger as Johannes 
 Michael Maien as Horst 
 Günter Stahl  as Lorenz 
 Otto Stern as Direktor 
 Arthur Binder  as Krautkopf 
 Wolfram Schaerf  as Vater 
 Gustaf Dennert as Schmall
 Walter Kraus as a taxi driver

References

Bibliography 
 Beni Eppenberger & Daniel Stapfer. Mädchen, Machos und Moneten: die unglaubliche Geschichte des Schweizer Kinounternehmers Erwin C. Dietrich. Verlag Scharfe Stiefel, 2006.

External links 
 

1968 films
1960s sex comedy films
German sex comedy films
West German films
1960s German-language films
Films directed by Ákos Ráthonyi
Gloria Film films
Sexploitation films
1960s German films